The LVR-Cultural Centre Village Synagogue Rödingen (German: LVR-Kulturhaus Landsynagoge Rödingen) is located  in Rödingen, municipality of Titz, district of Düren, State of North Rhine-Westphalia, Germany. It is a permanent exhibition in a former synagogue and a former family house of the head (Vorsteher) of the local Jewish community. It is dedicated to Jewish Life in rural Rhineland of past and present. Today the Rödingen synagogue is the only Jewish house of worship in the western Rhineland still largely in its original condition.

In 1999 the Landschaftsverband Rheinland (LVR), a assembly of municipalities, bought the entire property with the intention of opening the buildings to the public. The Cultural Centre was opened in September 2009, the European Day of Jewish Culture.

The former synagogue

 In the synagogue is still the Torah niche, located on the eastern wall of the synagogue  opposite the entrance. The original Torah ark (Hebrew: Aron Kodesh) with the ornate curtain, the parochet can be seen in a photo. Over the niche is still a long iron nail for the hanging of the Ner Tamid.

 The women’s gallery also exists. The gallery is fronted with plain wood panels and supported on two slender wooden pillars.
 There are traces of the original decor.

Permanent exhibition 
The exhibition is situated in the nine rooms of the family house.
 On the ground floor is a Media Room with a small library, the Family Room presents the stories of five generations of the Ullmann Family, who lived in this house from 1789 till 1934. In the Kosher kitchen are a number of exhibits.
 On the upper floor is the House and Synagogue History Room, the Village Sites Room with the theme Jewish cemetery, Judengasse (Jews‘ Alley) and jewish school. In The Rhineland Judaism Room is the Menorah from the former Synagogue in Vettweiß. In The Religion Room  is a Torah Wimpel (Hebrew: mappah) from 1762 and a Sefer Torah fragment with the pointer (Hebrew: Jad).

Activities
The Museum regularly hosts monthly lectures, workshops, seminars and concerts on Jewish religion and culture. It celebrates the yearly events International Museum Day, European Day of Jewish Culture and Tag des offenen Denkmals (European Heritage Days).

Literature
 Alexander Schmalz: LVR-Cultural Centre Village Synagogue Rödingen. Discover Jewish life in the Rheinland!, Medien und Dialog Schubert, Haigerloch 2012,  (in English)

External links
 Official website (in German)
 LVR-Cultural Centre Village Synagogue Rödingen. Jewish life in the Rhineland (in English)

Jewish museums in Germany
Former synagogues in Germany
Synagogues in North Rhine-Westphalia
Museums in North Rhine-Westphalia
2009 establishments in Germany
Museums established in 2009
Jewish German history
Buildings and structures in Düren (district)